Bryan Donnelly (born 8 April 1975) is a Canadian rower. He competed in the men's eight event at the 2000 Summer Olympics.

References

External links
 

1975 births
Living people
Canadian male rowers
Olympic rowers of Canada
Rowers at the 2000 Summer Olympics
Sportspeople from Dublin (city)